William Grierson may refer to:
 Sir William Grierson, 2nd Baronet (–1760), Scottish Jacobite, MP for Dumfriesshire 1709–1711
 William Grierson (engineer) (1863–1935), British civil engineer,  president of the Institution of Civil Engineers from 1929–30
 William Grierson (footballer) (born 1998), Filipino footballer

See also 
 Grierson (name)